Worthington Creek is a tributary of the Little Kanawha River,  long, in western West Virginia in the United States.

Worthington Creek flows for its entire length in northern Wood County.

According to the West Virginia Department of Environmental Protection, approximately 68% of the Worthington Creek watershed is forested, mostly deciduous.  Approximately 23% is used for pasture and agriculture, and approximately 9% is developed.

According to the Geographic Names Information System, Worthington Creek has also been known by the name "Worthingtons Creek."

See also
List of rivers of West Virginia

References 

Rivers of West Virginia
Little Kanawha River
Rivers of Wood County, West Virginia
Parkersburg, West Virginia